Mubashir Saddique (born 7 February 1982), is a Pakistani YouTuber Travel  Vlogger and food vlogger who is known for his Village Food Secrets channel and Mubashir Saddique Channel. He usually uploads videos of traditional village dishes, but also provides alternative recipes on how to cook modern cuisine and fast food, using limited facilities in a rural setting. He also has traveled many countries and has shown many cuisines and foods of those places in his vlogs. His father's dialogue, "Zindabad Mubashir Puttar  Maza e aagya" is also famous among his subscribers. He was born in Sialkot, Pakistan.

Early life 
He completed his primary and secondary education in Sialkot. Before joining YouTube, he used to work as a production manager at a soccer ball manufacturing factory in Sialkot located an hour and half from his home; however, he has since quit his factory job and works on his channel full-time. He says that he learnt all of his skills, like cooking and making earthenware stoves, from his mother. His father is a retired army driver. He has two younger brothers who are also YouTubers.

Internet career 
Saddique says that he used to cook a special dish for his parents every Sunday, and seeing this his brother encouraged him to start a vlog on YouTube. His brother helped him set up the YouTube channel and monetize it; the first videos that Saddique recorded were with a cellphone camera. Saddique said that for the first six months, his videos received an average of 10-20 views, then some of his videos went viral, and he gained popularity.

Saddique's channel is known for showing organic food, cooked in a village environment using simple tools and utensils such as earthenware pots, wooden cutting boards, and a hand-built earthenware oven; he grows his vegetables, and mills his flour from wheat that he also grows. He reached 1.00 million subscribers in 2018 and 1 million in April 2019. Saddique currently earns about 300,000 PKR (US$1,840) from his channel.
He also has a second Vlogging channel named Mubashir Saddique with over 142,000 subscribers.

As of April 2022, his YouTube channel has 3.56 million subscribers.

Controversies 
In November 2019, Saddique stated that he would not give any video interviews or allow any media group to accompany him to his home village. This came after certain groups of people posing as his guests took photographs of underage school girls and some other women in his village and a neighbouring village, and then uploaded them on social media without their prior consent. This invasion of privacy caused concern among Saddique's village elders. In another incident, a female YouTuber from Saddique's village uploaded videos of village girls without asking their permission. Subsequently, Saddique and his village elders came to an agreement that no one from outside the village would be allowed to use a camera within the village, and any invasion of the villagers' privacy would result in the suspect being handed over to the police.

Mubashir famously rarely wears shoes in his videos causing intrigue on social media.

References

Pakistani YouTubers
People from Sialkot District
Living people
Pakistani chefs
Food and cooking YouTubers
1985 births